The Municipality of Jezersko is a municipality in northern Slovenia. In 1995, Jezersko became part of Preddvor and became an independent municipality in 1998. Originally located in the historic region of Carinthia, it became part of the Upper Carniola Statistical Region in 2005. The seat of the municipality is the town of Zgornje Jezersko.

Jezersko is located in the remote Kokra Valley in the Kamnik–Savinja Alps, south of the Seeberg Saddle mountain pass and the border with the Austrian state of Carinthia.

History
The name of the area derives from a glacial lake near the settlement of Zgornje Jezersko that started to disappear after an earthquake in 1348. However, it was still described by Johann Weikhard von Valvasor in 1689 as a large lake. It gave the area its German name Seeland (literally "lake land", first recorded  as Seelant in 1496), and its Slovene equivalent , which came into use at the end of the 19th century. A document from 1391 mentions the church of "St. Oswald by the Lake" (Sv. Ožbolt pri Jezeru).

The remote village was part of the Duchy of Carinthia until 1919, administratively linked to Eisenkappel in the north; however, the residents did not consider themselves "true" Carinthians. It was therefore the only settlement already ceded by the Carinthian Landtag assembly to the newly established State of Slovenes, Croats and Serbs, before it was officially adjudicated together with the Meža Valley and Dravograd to the Kingdom of Serbs, Croats and Slovenes by the 1919 Treaty of Saint-Germain.

Settlements
In addition to the municipal seat of Zgornje Jezersko, the municipality also includes the settlement of Spodnje Jezersko.

Economy

Agriculture
The main activities that locals engage in are tourism, cattle breeding, and forestry. Cattle breeding is extensive in Jezersko, both by private farms and larger corporations. Jezersko is also the place of the origin of the breed of sheep known as the Jezersko–Solčava sheep. A sheep festival called the Sheep Dance is held annually in mid-August.

Tourism
Jezersko has a long tourist tradition. There is a 3-star hotel in Jezersko as well as private accommodation in self-catering units at vacation farms. The location of the village offers exceptional views of the surrounding mountains, and it is a starting point for mountain hiking routes to Grintovec, Mount Kočna, and Big Peak. The Kranj Lodge at Ledine and the Czech Lodge at Spodnje Ravni mountain huts are well known to mountain hikers. Lake Planšar in Zgornje Jezersko is an artificial lake created after World War II. In winter skiing is also possible.

References

External links
 
Municipality of Jezersko on Geopedia
Jezersko municipal site

 
Jezersko
1998 establishments in Slovenia